Shek Yue is one of the 17 constituencies in the Southern District, Hong Kong.

The constituency returns one district councillor to the Southern District Council, with an election every four years.

Shek Yue constituency has an estimated population of 15,692.

Councillors represented

Election results

2010s

Notes

References

Constituencies of Hong Kong
Constituencies of Southern District Council
2007 establishments in Hong Kong
Constituencies established in 2007